The Kerk Street Mosque, also known as the Jumah Mosque, is located in Johannesburg, South Africa.

The mosque, situated on stand 788, is one of the oldest mosques and places of worship in Johannesburg.

The first Muslim community to occupy the land set up a tent in the closing years of the nineteenth century, then in 1906 built a wood and corrugated iron structure. In 1918 construction of a brick walled structure was completed. The brick mosque was demolished in 1990 and was replaced with the modern Kerk Street Mosque designed by Driehaus Prize winner Abdel-Wahed El-Wakil.

History

The arrival of the Malay slaves and political prisoners by the Dutch East India Company in 1654 from Batavia was the first introduction of Islam in Cape Town and subsequently South Africa. The Malays were not initially given worshiping rights but the growing number of slaves brought in by the Dutch East India Company from Indonesia and India, including Bengal and the Malabar coast spread Islam which forced the Cape Colony to give rights to worship Islam. This saw the first application for land to build the first Mosque in 1793 in the Cape of Good Hope.

After the discovery of gold in Johannesburg and the growing number of Muslims, Jumah Masjid was built in 1906 and renovated and enlarged in 1918 due to the increase in worshippers. Before the 1990 rebuilding, the Jumah Masjid could accommodate about 230 worshippers.

Design
The site measures 740m2, bounded by Sauer Street and Kerk Street. Although the site has been used as a mosque since the 1890s, the first formal structure was built on this site 76 years ago (1918). Structural collapse and inadequate facilities led to the commissioning of the current project. The unique feature of this mosque is that it follows the city grid of Johannesburg but the inside is designed to face Makkah. From Johannesburg, that is 11° east of the strict northerly pole. It is built along the strict northerly line of the street and has been angled internally to exactly 11°.

Architect Muhammad Mayet's design has a substantial vocabulary of traditional elements contained within its various parts: domes, squinches, pendentives, fan vault and cross vaults. Artisans from Morocco were flown in to do the intricate plasterwork, a craftsman from Egypt was responsible for the wood carving and Turkish professionals hand carved the delicate marble used to adorn the mosque. The exterior is plastered and painted white, creating a plain but elegant appearance that allows the form to be clearly read.

The prayer hall consists of a series of arches on pillars with segmental arches over supporting segmental vaults which run parallel to the Qibla wall. The vaults are interrupted in the middle by a dome which establishes a central axis pointing towards Makkah. The direction of Makkah is emphasized by the main dome on the north side which is raised on a drum which filters light into the interior directly above the mihrab.

The building is of load-bearing brick and masonry construction built on top of a combination of pile and raft concrete foundations. This construction means the temperature inside the mosque remains a constant 23 °C. It can accommodate up to 2000 people at a time.

Heritage status
The mosque was declared a national monument by the National Monument Council "because of its historical, aesthetic and cultural value". The Kerk Street Mosque is historically and culturally significant for the following reasons:
 The Kerk Street Mosque is situated on the oldest Muslim mosque site in Johannesburg
 The Kerk Street Mosque is associated with the Muslim community of Johannesburg and carries both religious and cultural significance
 The Kerk Street Mosque is a beautiful building exhibiting high quality design and craftsmanship giving it aesthetic significance

References

Mosques in South Africa
Religious buildings and structures in Johannesburg
Mosques completed in 1990
Heritage Buildings in Johannesburg
New Classical architecture
Abdel-Wahed El-Wakil buildings
20th-century religious buildings and structures in South Africa